Aitebar was  the third album of the Pakistani band Vital Signs.

Track listing
All music arranged, composed and produced by Vital Signs. All songs written by Shoaib Mansoor.

Personnel
All information is taken from the CD.

Vital Signs
Junaid Jamshed Khan – vocals
Rohail Hyatt – keyboard, backing vocals
Shehzad Hasan – bass guitars
Rizwan-ul-Haq – lead guitars

Additional musicians
Guitars by Assad Ahmed

Production
Produced by Dj khan
Recorded & Mixed at Pyramid Studios in Rawalpindi, Pakistan
Sound engineering by Iqbal Asif
Album art by Creative Unit (Pvt.)Ltd.
Photography by Rooha Gaznavi

External links
Vital Signs – A Personal History by NFP
Vital Signs Album 3 Aitebar Videos

1993 albums
Vital Signs (band) albums
Urdu-language albums